Incorrigible (Swedish: Rötägg)  is a 1946 Swedish drama film directed by Arne Mattsson and starring Stig Olin, Stig Järrel and Marianne Löfgren. It was made at the Centrumateljéerna Studios in Stockholm and on location in the city. The film's sets were designed by the art director Bertil Duroj.

Cast

 Stig Olin as 	Krister Sundbom
 Stig Järrel as 	Björn Mander
 Marianne Löfgren as 	Olga Sundbom
 Arnold Sjöstrand as	Bring
 Elsie Albiin as 	Rosa Langenfeldt
 Erik 'Bullen' Berglund as 	Hacksén
 Ingrid Backlin as 	Vera
 Ingemar Pallin as 	Bengt Ekner
 Harriett Philipson as 	Birgitta Mander
 Gunnar Björnstrand as Dr. Bertil Langenfeldt
 Börje Mellvig as 	Furustam
 Bengt Logardt as 	Åke Holm
 Tord Stål as 	Harry Helander
 Carl Hagman as 	School Janitor
 Signe Wirff as 	Hanna
 Julia Cæsar as 	Hostess
 Kurt Willbing as 	Svenne
 Ragnar Planthaber as 	Putte Enkvist
 Bo Wärff as 	Viktor 'Vicke' Hall
 Bengt Carenborg as 	Kalle Svensson
 Olof Ek as 	Person
 Ivar Kåge as 	John Sundbom
 Per-Axel Arosenius as 	Teacher 
 Bertil Berglund as 	Andersson 
 Astrid Bodin as 	Cook 
 Nils Dahlgren as 	Police Inspector Gustafsson 
 Edvard Danielsson as 	Cue Player 
 Nils Ekman as 	Teacher 
 Mary Gräber as 	Rosalie 
 Eric Gustafson as 	Maître d' 
 Stina Hedberg as 	Lady 
 Agda Helin as 	Lady 
 Magnus Kesster as 	Police Officer 
 Mimi Nelson as 	Waitress 
 Ivar Wahlgren as Police Officer 
 Birger Åsander as Cue Player

References

Bibliography 
 Björklund, Elisabet & Larsson, Mariah. Swedish Cinema and the Sexual Revolution: Critical Essays. McFarland, 2016.

External links 
 

1946 films
Swedish drama films
1946 drama films
1940s Swedish-language films
Films directed by Arne Mattsson
1940s Swedish films